Valentina Iseppi (born 6 February 1997) is an Italian rower. She competed in the women's quadruple sculls event at the 2020 Summer Olympics.

References

External links
 Washington Huskies bio
 

1997 births
Living people
Italian female rowers
Olympic rowers of Italy
Rowers at the 2020 Summer Olympics
Sportspeople from the Province of Brescia
Washington Huskies women's rowers